Unavi Rural LLG is a local-level government (LLG) of Eastern Highlands Province, Papua New Guinea.

Wards
01. Megino No. 2
02. Maimafu
03. Giuasa
04. Mane No. 2
05. Maiva
06. Ubaigubi
07. Herowana
08. Agibu
09. Mane No. 1

References

Local-level governments of Eastern Highlands Province